The Huangpu Sports Centre Stadium (Simplified Chinese: 黄埔体育中心) is a multi-purpose stadium in Huangpu District, Guangzhou, China. the stadium has a capacity of 12,000 people.

External links
 StadiumDB page

References

Football venues in China
Sports venues in Guangdong
Venues of the 2010 Asian Games